Quamdeen Ayopo Dosunmu (born January 17, 2000) is an American professional basketball player for the Chicago Bulls of the National Basketball Association (NBA). He played college basketball at Illinois, where he was named a consensus first-team All-American in his junior season.

Early life and high school career
Dosunmu was born in Chicago to Nigerian immigrants. He descends from the Yoruba people in Nigeria, and his name Ayo means "joy" in the Yoruba language. Dosunmu began his high school career at Chicago's Westinghouse College Prep, where he helped lead the Warriors to a 2015 conference championship against Al Raby High School and scored a season-high 40 points against Crane High School as a freshman, earning Chicago Sun-Times All-City Accolades. Dosunmu transferred after his freshman year to Morgan Park. During his junior year, Dosunmu led the Mustangs to a 3A State Championship, despite getting hurt in the semi-finals. In his senior year, Dosunmu led the Mustangs once again to a state championship, in which he scored 28 points; breaking an IHSA record for points scored in a championship game.

In March 2018, Dosunmu was named one of 26 high school seniors who participated in the Jordan Brand Classic on April 8, 2018, at the Barclays Center in Brooklyn, New York. Dosunmu is the third Illini to be selected to play in the Jordan Classic, joining Dee Brown who played for the Red team in 2002 and Jalen Coleman-Lands who played in 2015. Dosunmu was also selected to play in the second annual Iverson Roundball Classic All-American Game in April 2018 at Souderton Area High School outside of Philadelphia, Pennsylvania. During his senior season, Dosunmu averaged 25.2 points, 7.4 rebounds, 7.3 assists and 2.7 steals, leading Morgan Park to a second-straight IHSA Class 3A championship. Dosunmu was also named a Consensus first-team All-State selection by the Associated Press, Chicago Tribune, Chicago Sun-Times, Champaign News-Gazette and Illinois Basketball Coaches Association (IBCA) following his senior season.

Recruiting
On October 19, 2017, Dosunmu verbally committed to play college basketball for Illinois and head coach Brad Underwood. Dosunmu announced his commitment to Illinois over Wake Forest at the flagship Jordan Brand Store on State Street in the Chicago Loop. Dosunmu signed his National Letter of Intent in November 2017 to attend Illinois.

College career

Dosunmu made his college debut on November 8, 2018, against Evansville, recording 18 points on 8-of-15 shooting, with six rebounds, four assists and three steals. Following the season, Dosunmu was named to the All-Big Ten Freshman Team and was named as an honorable mention for the All-Big 10 Team. He averaged 13.8 points and 3.3 assists per game as a freshman.

Dosunmu hit a last-second jump shot in a 64–62 win over Michigan on January 25, 2020, and finished with 27 points. On February 11, Dosunmu was injured late in a 70–69 loss to Michigan State. Despite an MRI showing no structural damage, Dosunmu missed the following game against Rutgers. In his return from injury, Dosunmu scored 24 points in a 62–56 win at Penn State. At the close of the regular season, Dosunmu was named to the First Team All-Big Ten by the media and Second Team by the coaches. As a sophomore, Dosunmu averaged 16.6 points, 4.3 rebounds, and 3.3 assists per game. Following the season, Dosunmu declared for the 2020 NBA draft. Dosunmu withdrew from the draft to return to Illinois for his junior season on July 31, 2020.

In his junior season debut on November 25, 2020, Dosunmu recorded 28 points, 10 rebounds and five assists in a 122–60 win against North Carolina A&T. On December 12, he scored a career-high 36 points in an 81–78 loss to Missouri. On February 6, 2021, he became the third player in program history to register a triple-double, with 21 points, 12 rebounds and 12 assists in a 75–60 victory over Wisconsin. On February 20, Dosunmu recorded his second triple-double, with 19 points, 10 rebounds and 10 assists in a 94–63 win over Minnesota. On February 23, Dosunmu suffered a broken nose during a 81–72 loss to Michigan State. On March 14, he recorded 16 points and nine rebounds in a 91–88 win over Ohio State in the Big Ten Men's Basketball Championship game. He was named the Big Ten tournament Most Outstanding Player. Dosunmu was a consensus first-team All-American and won the Bob Cousy Award as top point guard in the nation. On April 6, 2021, Dosunmu declared for the 2021 NBA draft, ending his three-year career with Illinois.

On January 6, 2022, Dosunmu's number 11 was honored by the Illini.

Professional career

Chicago Bulls (2021–present) 
Dosunmu was selected in the second round of the 2021 NBA draft with the 38th pick by his hometown team, the Chicago Bulls. On August 18, 2021, the Chicago Bulls announced that they had signed Dosunmu. On December 8, 2021, Dosunmu entered the starting lineup for the Bulls. He scored 11 points along with six rebounds and eight assists in a 109–97 victory over the Denver Nuggets. On January 25, 2022, Dosunmu opened with nine consecutive made field goals, surpassing Orlando Woolridge's Bulls rookie record of eight.

On December 21, 2022, Dosunmu put up a buzzer-beating, game-winning putback in a 110–108 win over the Atlanta Hawks.

National team career
In May 2018, Dosunmu was among the 32 players who earned an invitation to the training camp at the United States Olympic Training Center in Colorado Springs, Colorado for USA Basketball Men's U18 National Team in preparation for the 2018 FIBA Under-18 Americas Championship. Dosunmu won a gold medal with the U18 National Team, while averaging 9.5 points, 4.5 assists and 2.3 rebounds during the international competition.

Career statistics

NBA

Regular season

|-
| style="text-align:left;"| 
| style="text-align:left;"| Chicago
| 77 || 40 || 27.4 || .520 || .376 || .679 || 2.8 || 3.3 || 0.8 || 0.4 || 8.8
|-
| style="text-align:left;"| 
| style="text-align:left;"| Chicago
| 20 || 20 || 29.0 || .515 || .323 || .944 || 3.5 || 2.9 || 0.7 || 0.5 || 10.7
|- class="sortbottom"
| style="text-align:center;" colspan="2"| Career
| 97 || 60 || 27.7 || .518 || .363 || .729 || 2.9 || 2.9 || 0.8 || 0.4 || 9.2

Playoffs

|-
| style="text-align:left;" | 2022
| style="text-align:left;" | Chicago
| 5 || 1 || 17.2 || .308 || .231 || 1.000 || 2.6 || 2.2 || .2 || .0 || 4.0
|- class="sortbottom"
| style="text-align:center;" colspan="2"|Career
| 5 || 1 || 17.2 || .308 || .231 || 1.000 || 2.6 || 2.2 || .2 || .0 || 4.0

College

|-
| style="text-align:left;"| 2018–19
| style="text-align:left;"| Illinois
| 32 || 32 || 31.3 || .435 || .352 || .695 || 4.0 || 3.3 || 1.3 || .3 || 13.8
|-
| style="text-align:left;"| 2019–20
| style="text-align:left;"| Illinois
| 30 || 30 || 33.5 || .484 || .296 || .755 || 4.3 || 3.3 || .8 || .2 || 16.6
|-
| style="text-align:left;"| 2020–21
| style="text-align:left;"| Illinois
| 28 || 28 || 35.1 || .488 || .390 || .783 || 6.3 || 5.3 || 1.1 || .2 || 20.1
|- class="sortbottom"
| style="text-align:center;" colspan="2"| Career
| 90 || 90 || 33.2 || .470 || .345 || .750 || 4.8 || 3.9 || 1.1 || .2 || 16.7

References

External links
Illinois Fighting Illini bio
USA Basketball bio

2000 births
Living people
21st-century African-American sportspeople
African-American basketball players
All-American college men's basketball players
American men's basketball players
American people of Yoruba descent
American sportspeople of Nigerian descent
Basketball players from Chicago
Chicago Bulls draft picks
Chicago Bulls players
Illinois Fighting Illini men's basketball players
Point guards
Shooting guards
Yoruba sportspeople